"Let's Push Things Forward" is a song by English rapper and producer Mike Skinner under the music project the Streets. It was released in April 2002 as the second single from their debut studio album, Original Pirate Material. It peaked at number 30 on the UK chart. The song is performed by Mike Skinner and Kevin Mark Trail.

Critical reception
"'Let's Push Things Forward' grew on me…" remarked Pink Floyd's David Gilmour. "It's forward-looking and anarchic. It has its own anti-big-company ethos, which I like. And it has strange little quirks of timing that I find very hard to use. Perhaps it will influence me in the future. I don't know. But it's nice to hear something that works which is outside your usual frame of reference."

Music video
The music video was directed by the Snorri Brothers and premiered in April 2002. It was filmed in South London with the first shot looking south in Deptford Church Street, London

Track listing

CD 1
 "Let's Push Things Forward" (Album Version)
 "Let's Push Things Forward" (Studio Gangsters Mix)
 "Let's Push Things Forward" (Zed Bias Dub Mix)

CD 2
 "Let's Push Things Forward" (Album Version)
 "All Got Our Runnins"
 "Don't Mug Yourself" (Instrumental)

Charts

References

2002 songs
2002 singles
The Streets songs
Locked On Records singles